Hyland Franklin "Buddy" Fowler Jr. (born July 2, 1955) is an American politician from Virginia. A member of the Republican Party, Fowler is the member of the Virginia House of Delegates for the 55th district, succeeding John Cox.

In 2015, Fowler was criticized by media outlets and fellow members of the Virginia Assembly for sharing a meme on social media that some considered racist.

During the 2019 session of the Virginia General Assembly, Fowler voted to "pass by indefinitely" the Equal Rights Amendment while it was in a House Privileges and Elections sub-committee. This vote prevented the resolution from being considered or voted on by the full committee and effectively ended the resolutions progress through the House of Delegates for the remained of the session.

References

External links
 
 Biography at Ballotpedia
 

Living people
Republican Party members of the Virginia House of Delegates
Place of birth missing (living people)
1955 births
21st-century American politicians